John Bodkin ( – 1742), Esquire. Born the second son of Counsellor-at-law, John Bodkin and Mary Clarke of Carrowbeg House, Belclare, Tuam, County Galway, Ireland. In 1741, John Bodkin, the second son of a landed gentry family in Co Galway, Ireland was arrested on the charge of murdering his older brother, Dominick. He was found guilty of the crime even though he refused to admit his guilt during his trial or thereafter. He was hanged, drawn and quartered in Galway City on Saturday, 20 March 1742.

Background
In 1739, John’s older brother, Dominick, heir to the family estate, died. Lord Athenry, the local Justice of the Peace deemed his death as a natural event. The suggestion that he was murdered only came to light in the aftermath of the Bodkin murders in 1741. In this inheritance-motivated family feud, three members of the Bodkin family, Oliver Bodkin, Oliver’s pregnant wife, Margery, his son, Oliver, a visitor, Marcus Lynch of Galway and from four to seven unnamed servants were murdered.  On the gallows in 1741, a member of the Bodkin family convicted of the Bodkin murders, accused John Bodkin of murdering his older brother. On hearing the charge, John Bodkin absconded but was arrested shortly afterwards and charged with fratricide.

Name of the murdered brother
The first name of John Bodkin’s older brother, Dominick, has been clarified by a primary source that draws on a description of his trial in Pue’s Occurrences in 1742:

In contrast, Oliver J Burke referred to the victim as Patrick Bodkin rather than as Dominick Bodkin in his 1885 Anecdotes of the Connaught Circuit… (p 86-92).  Burke may have exercised licence to avoid confusion with John’s uncle, the infamous Dominick “Blind” Bodkin. In fact, Patrick was the younger rather than the older brother of John Bodkin. More recent accounts  have followed Burke’s naming of the victim as Patrick Bodkin, but Dominick Bodkin is used here following his identification, as the victim, by a primary source.

Execution
When John Bodkin was found guilty of murdering his older brother, Dominick, his response mystified the clergy, the sheriff and the gentlemen of the city. On the gibbet at Gallows Green (now Eyre Square), Galway, he refused to acknowledge his innocence or guilt of the heinous crime of fratricide. Instead, as the noose tightened around his neck, he proclaimed, "I forgive Mankind", implying that he was not guilty.  Despite his public pronouncement, he was hanged, drawn and quartered in 1742 as recorded in Pue’s Occurrences:

References

1720 births
1742 deaths
18th-century Irish people
Fratricides
Irish people convicted of murder
People executed by the Kingdom of Ireland by hanging
People from County Galway